Chhnam Oun 16  is a 1992 Cambodian musical movie starring Tep Rundaro, Pisith Pilika, Oum Sovanny, Ampor Tevi, and other stars of the time. The film was released as the 8th Som Ang Rathanak's musical film.

Cast
 Tep Rundaro
 Yous Bovannak
 Pisith Pilika
 Ampor Tevi
 Hong Polee Maktura
 Neary Roth Guntea
 Yuthara Chany
 Keo Koliyan
 Hok Leakenna
 Oum Sovanny
 Prum Sovuthy
 Jandarathy
 Bae Vannara
 Chum Achun
 Serey Vichara
 Aek Omrah

Soundtrack

References

Cambodian drama films
Khmer-language films
1992 films
1990s musical films